Abu Talha (30 October 1939) is a Jatiya Party (Ershad) politician and the former Member of Parliament of Natore-1.

Career
Talha was elected to parliament from Natore-1 as a Jatiya Party candidate in 2008. He is the Vice-Chairman of Jatiya Party. In 2017, Anti-Corruption Commission sued him for evading 18 million taka in taxes.

References

Jatiya Party politicians
Living people
9th Jatiya Sangsad members
1939 births